is a mecha anime television series that aired from 1981 to 1982 in Japan. The show was also popular in Hong Kong and was aired there around the same time.  There are 52 episodes that were aired at 30 minutes each.

Original story
The story is about a young boy named Hiro Taikai who finds a gold lighter which turns out to be the giant Golden Warrior Gold Lightan, who has the mission to save the earth from an invasion by King Ibalda.  Gold Lightan joined forces with his robot teammates to ruin the plots of King Ibalda and destroy invading alien robots by using his surpassing hand and leg strikes.  Hiro also founded a group called the "Bratty Rangers" with his friends.

Concept
The robot is usually disguised as a tiny gold Zippo-style lighter in Hiro's pocket. When called upon, Gold Lightan transforms into a giant robot towering at 30 meters and weighing 200 tons.  All robots in the show are sentient and do not require pilots. Usually the robot ends a battle with a trademark golden hand stab move which drives a hand strike cutting the enemy robots body, pulling out and smashing the heartbox energy device.

Staff
Presenter: Kenji Yoshida
Planners: Ippei Kuri, Shigeru Yanagawa
Producer: Tomoyuki Miyata
Series Composition: Akiyoshi Sakai
Chief Director: Koichi Mashimo
Character Design: Ippei Kuri
Mecha Design: Shoji Kawamori
Music: Masayuki Jinbo, Masayuki Yamamoto
Animation director: Takashi Nakamura (Episode 6, 22, 30, 41, 48)
Key Animation: Takashi Nakamura (Episode 41)

Characters

Lightan Robots

Media

Anime

Episodes
This is a list of episodes from the television show Golden Warrior Gold Lightan in order by production number.

Manga
On December 23, 2022, a spin-off manga written by Ruma Onbutsu and illustrated by Lotus and Rena Mikami began serialization on the Comic Polca website.

Merchandise
In 2005, Hong Kong Bandai reissued the semi-original robots as part of the Soul of Chogokin label.  The individual robots were released with a hard plastic display case, robot footstand, red carpet storage box, interchangeable gold hands pieces, and an enemy's heartbox energy device.  This version also feature the robots with high quality 18K gold plating.  The toys can be purchased individually or as a set.  There are 2 known sets in the reissues. one is the first generation grey box, available in Hong Kong and Japan, featuring 6 of the robots;  the other is an exclusive redcarpet wooden box set, known to be available only in Japan, featuring all 11 robots.

Later, in 2005, replicas were re-released by Hung Hing toys in Hong Kong and Macau featuring the robots built in cheaper die-cast metals. The texture and few minor details were inconsistent between the products.  Multiple variations of the toys were sold as well.  One such version is the large toy Gold Lightan measuring at 11.5 inches in height when standing in robot form, although only 2,000 were manufactured.  Additionally, at the base of the foot, of the toy, is a label counting the manufactured number out of 2,000.  Other variations include team robots in different colors or grey low weight plastic/silver exclusive to Hong Kong and Macau.

There are more variations and replicas of Gold Lightan than any others because it is the lead robot in the series.  There are other design variations. For example, older models of I.C. Lightan uses AA batteries to light up its LED eye, while newer reissues of the toy uses flat button or coin batteries. None of these re-releases are completely identical to the original 1980s GB series Chogokin toy launch from 1979 to 1983, by Popy Pleasure.  The originals are valued at a higher price, as they were constructed with different grades of diecast metals as well as high quality acrylonitrile butadiene styrene.

In 2006, Bandai released a new version of the Gold Lightan in their Soul of Chogokin line-up - GX 32 The Gold Lightan. Not only were they considered to be one of the most detailed and sophisticated Gold Lightan toys yet, they were plated with 18K gold, as their predecessors were.  Aside from being able to transform into a lighter, just like the original toys, its joints were well structured.  The package comes with a stand, interchangeable hands, and a heartbox energy device.  The toy was a success and was well received by fans in Japan and Hong Kong. This caused Bandai Hong Kong to make a singular stand showcase just for the Gold Lightan, itself.

The titular robot is a playable character in the fighting game Tatsunoko vs. Capcom: Ultimate All-Stars. When he fights, he can only be single as opposed to character doubles, since he is so big and powerful.

References

External links
 Tatsunoko Database
 Soul of Chogokin Gold Lightan at CollectionDX
 Lightan Toys

1981 anime television series debuts
Super robot anime and manga
Tatsunoko Production
TV Tokyo original programming